Arthur Browne may refer to:
 Arthur Browne (1732–1779), Irish politician, MP  for Gowran 1769–76, County Mayo 1776–79
 Arthur Browne (1756–1805), Irish politician, MP for Dublin University 1783–1800
 Arthur Browne (bishop) (1864–1951), Anglican priest, Bishop of Bermuda 1925–48
 Arthur Browne, 8th Marquess of Sligo (1867–1951), Irish soldier and peer, known as Lord Arthur Browne (1903 to 1941)
 Arthur Browne, recently retired editor and publisher of the New York Daily News

See also 
 Arthur Brown (disambiguation)
 Browne (surname)